The Mercer Area School District is a small, suburban, public school district serving parts of Mercer County, Pennsylvania, US. Its namesake and central locality is the borough of Mercer; other communities in the district include Jefferson Township, Coolspring Township, Findley Township and East Lackawannock Township. According to 2002 local census data, it serves a resident population of 11,000. By 2010, the district's population declined to 10,745 people. In 2009, the district residents' per capita income was $16,996, while the median family income was $44,043.

Mercer Area School District operates two schools: Mercer Area Elementary School and Mercer Area Middle - High School.

Extracurriculars
Mercer Area School District provides an extensive number of clubs, activities and a sports program.

Sports
Mercer Area School District  funds these sports :

Boys
Baseball - AA
Basketball - AA
Cross Country - A
Football - A
Golf - AA
Soccer - A
Track and Field - AA
Wrestling	- AA

Girls
Basketball - AA
Cross Country - A
Soccer (Fall) - A
Softball - AA
Track and Field - AA
Volleyball - AA

Middle School Sports

Boys
Baseball
Basketball
Cross Country
Football
Soccer
Track and Field
Wrestling	

Girls
Basketball
Cross Country
Track and Field
Volleyball

According to PIAA directory July 2013

References

School districts in Mercer County, Pennsylvania